The 2015–16 Svenska Cupen will be the 60th season of Svenska Cupen and the fourth season with the current format. The winners of the competition will earn a place in the second qualifying round of the 2016–17 UEFA Europa League.

A total of 96 clubs will enter the competition.

The final was played on 5 May 2016 and contested between Malmö FF and BK Häcken at Swedbank Stadion, Malmö, with BK Häcken winning.

Teams

Round and draw dates
The schedule of the competition is as follows.

Qualifying rounds 

The only two associations of the Swedish District Football Associations that had a qualifying round were Dalarnas FF and Örebro Läns FF, with the teams from other districts being determined though district championships or by club ranking in 2014.

Round 1
64 teams from the third tier or lower of the Swedish league system will compete in this round. The round will be played between 9 June and 5 August 2015 with the majority of the fixtures played in early August. The number in brackets indicates what tier of Swedish football each team competed in during the 2015 season.

Round 2
All teams from 2015 Allsvenskan and 2015 Superettan entered in this round, 32 teams in total, where they were joined by the 32 winners from round 1. The 32 teams from Allsvenskan and Superettan were seeded and played against the 32 winners from round 1, the matches was played at the home venues for the unseeded teams. The 16 northernmost seeded teams were drawn against the 16 northernmost unseeded teams and the same with the southernmost teams.

The draw was made on 7 August 2015. The second round will be played on 19 and 20 August 2015, but some matches may be moved to a later date depending on participation in 2015–16 UEFA Champions League and 2015–16 UEFA Europa League. The number in brackets indicates what tier of Swedish football each team competed in during the 2015 season. Somaliska UF and Torstorps IF were the lowest-ranked teams in this round, competing in Division 4, the sixth tier of Swedish football.

Group stage
The 32 winners from round 2 will be divided into eight groups of four teams. The 16 highest ranked winners from the previous rounds will be seeded to the top two positions in each groups and the 16 remaining winners will be unseeded in the draw. The ranking of the 16 seeded teams was decided by league position in the 2015 season. All teams in the group stage play each other once, the highest ranked teams from the previous rounds and teams from tier three or lower have the right to play two home matches. The draw was held on 26 November 2015. The group stage will begin on 20 February and concluded on 6 March 2016.

All times listed below are in Central European Time (UTC+1).

Tie-breaking criteria and key
If two or more teams are equal on points on completion of the group matches, the following criteria will be applied to determine the rankings
Superior goal difference
Higher number of goals scored
Result between the teams in question
Higher league position in the 2015 season

Group 1

Group 2

Group 3

Group 4

Group 5

Group 6

Group 7

Group 8

Knockout stage

Qualified teams

Bracket

Quarter-finals 
The quarter-finals consists of the eight teams that won their respective group in the previous round and the four best group winners were seeded and drawn against the other four group winners, with the seeded teams entitled to play the match at their home venue. Halmstads BK are the only team in the quarter-finals that will not play in the top tier, Allsvenskan, for the 2016 season as they will play in the second tier, Superettan.

The draw for the quarter-finals was held on 7 March and the quarter-final matches were played on 12, 13 and 15 March 2016.

Semi-finals 
The semi-finals consist of the four winners from the quarter-finals. The draw will be a free draw and the first drawn team in each pairing play the match at their home venue.

The draw for the semi-finals was held on 8 March and the semi-final matches be played on 19 and 20 March 2016.

Final

The final will be played on 5 May 2016. The home team was determined with a draw held on 21 March.

Top scorers

Notes

References

External links
 Official site 

Svenska Cupen seasons
Cupen
Cupen
Sweden